Christopher Owen Ayres (May 16, 1965 – October 18, 2021) was an American actor, director and scriptwriter. He worked on voice acting and ADR directing on a number of English dubs of Japanese anime shows at Funimation, OkraTron 5000, New Generation Pictures and Seraphim Digital / Sentai Filmworks. In anime, he was known as the voice of Frieza from Dragon Ball Z Kai and Dragon Ball Super, Kei Kurono from Gantz, Prince Soma from Black Butler, and Shingen Takeda from the Sengoku Basara series. He was also known for Mock Combat for Cosplay panels at anime conventions.

Early life and career
Ayres had his first professional acting gig in a commercial for Lollipop Soft Drinks in Richmond, Virginia when he was six years old. The Ayres family moved to the Alief, Houston area of Houston, Texas when he was 12 where Chris attended Alief Middle School and then Alief Elsik High School. He graduated in 1983. After graduating high school Ayres attended Lon Morris College in Jacksonville, Texas and studied Theatre until 1985. He returned to Houston and continued to study Theatre at the University of Houston. Prior to his voice acting and ADR directing career he was well known as a stage director, choreographer and fight director in the Houston, Texas Theatre community.

Personal life and death 
In November 2017, Ayres was diagnosed with end-stage chronic obstructive pulmonary disease and required a double lung transplant to survive. A YouCaring fundraiser was created that sought $25,000 to assist with medical care and procedures.

Ayres died on October 18, 2021, at the age of 56, following years of complications from pulmonary disease. His death was announced on Twitter the following day by his partner and fellow voice actress, Krystal LaPorte.

Filmography

Anime

Films

Video games

Theater credits

References

External links
 Official website (archive)

 Christopher Ayres at the CrystalAcids Anime Voice Actor Database

1965 births
2021 deaths
People from Richmond, Virginia
Male actors from Richmond, Virginia
Lon Morris College alumni
American theatre directors
American choreographers
Respiratory disease deaths in Texas
Deaths from chronic obstructive pulmonary disease
American male voice actors
American male video game actors
American voice directors
20th-century American male actors
21st-century American male actors